Nymphargus chami is a species of frog in the family Centrolenidae, formerly placed in Cochranella. It is endemic to Colombia where it occurs on the Cordillera Occidental in the Antioquia and Risaralda departments.

Its natural habitats are very humid tropical forests and cloud forests where it occurs on vegetation next to streams. Its conservation status is unclear but threats to it include timber extraction, cattle raising and agricultural development. It is directly threatened by the deforestation of the foothills in Paramillo National Park. 

The dorsum is shagreen with numerous subconical tubercles.

References

chami
Amphibians of Colombia
Endemic fauna of Colombia
Amphibians described in 1995
Taxa named by John Douglas Lynch
Taxonomy articles created by Polbot